Metacemyia is a genus of parasitic flies in the family Tachinidae.

Species
Metacemyia aartseni Zeegers, 2007
Metacemyia calloti (Séguy, 1936)
Metacemyia setosa Crosskey, 1973
Metacemyia uncinata (Thomson, 1869)

References

Exoristinae
Diptera of Asia
Diptera of Europe
Diptera of Africa
Tachinidae genera